Julia Mrozinski (born 16 February 2000) is a German swimmer. She competed in the women's 200 metre freestyle event at the 2020 European Aquatics Championships, in Budapest, Hungary.

References

2000 births
Living people
German female swimmers
German female freestyle swimmers
Place of birth missing (living people)
Swimmers at the 2018 Summer Youth Olympics
European Games gold medalists for Germany
European Games medalists in swimming
Swimmers at the 2015 European Games
21st-century German women